Reckon is an Australian software company that provides desktop and cloud-based accounting software for accountants, bookkeepers, small to medium businesses, and personal users. The company has offices in Australia, New Zealand, the United Kingdom, and the United States. Reckon has over 600,000 businesses using its software across Australia and New Zealand.

History 
Reckon Limited was founded by Greg Wilkinson in 1987, who was its Chief Executive Officer until 2006. Funded initially with the $2,000 dollar credit limit on a friend’s credit card, Greg Wilkinson started republishing and distributing Quicken & QuickBooks software products in Australia under a licensing agreement with Intuit. For over 25 years, Reckon managed the marketing, distribution and development of these products.

In 2012, Intuit announced the decision to take back the QuickBooks & Quicken name, release a cloud accounting program called QuickBooks Online and start selling it in Australia. Reckon continues to sell QuickBooks desktop accounting software under its own brand, Reckon Accounts. The Australian version of the Quicken personal finance products were renamed Reckon Accounts Personal in late 2012.

In 2013, Reckon launched a cloud accounting program called Reckon One.

In August 2017, Reckon completed the demerger of its Document Management division into a new London-based company called GetBusy. In November 2017, MYOB announced it would acquire Reckon's Accountants Group for A$180 million. However, in June 2018, MYOB terminated the deal due to the regulatory processes taking longer than anticipated.

Since then Reckon has gone on to add many products to its business ecosystem including  Reckon Cloud POS, a cloud-based point-of-sale system, Reckon Loans for business financing and an allied health practice management software called Better Clinics. In May 2019, Reckon launched the Reckon Single Touch Payroll App to address ATO legislation for payroll reporting. The app accumulated over 30,000 downloads in 4 months making it one of Reckon's most popular products to date.

Reckon includes APS, an accounting practice management software that's used by 70% of the countries top accounting practices, and three of the Big Four accountancy firms.

In May 2022, Reckon agreed to sell its Reckon Accountants Group to UK-based Access Group for A$100 million. The deal included Reckon's APS and Reckon Elite software. The acquisition was completed in August 2022.

Products 
 Reckon's business division provides software for small businesses, including accounting software, payroll, STP reporting, business loans and clinic management software.
 Reckon legal division includes billing software for law firms, predominantly run out of the US.

References

1987 establishments in Australia
Accounting software
Software companies established in 1987
Companies listed on the Australian Securities Exchange
Software companies of Australia